LeShundra "DeDee" Nathan (born April 20, 1968, in Birmingham, Alabama) is a retired heptathlete from the United States, who won the gold medal at the 1991 Pan American Games in Havana, Cuba. She is a two-time U.S. champion (2000 and 2001) and the 1999 World Indoor pentathlon gold medalist. She attended high school at South Side High School in Fort Wayne, Indiana and later on graduated from Indiana University.

She was the winner of the 1999 Hypo-Meeting, but placed only twelfth the following year.

International competitions

Personal bests
200 metres - 24.11
800 metres - 2:16.01
100 metres hurdles - 13.10
High jump - 1.81
Long jump - 6.59
Shot put - 16.06
Javelin throw - 50.08
Heptathlon - 6577

External links
 
 USATF Profile

1968 births
Living people
American heptathletes
Sportspeople from Fort Wayne, Indiana
Track and field athletes from Birmingham, Alabama
Track and field athletes from Indiana
African-American female track and field athletes
Olympic track and field athletes of the United States
Athletes (track and field) at the 2000 Summer Olympics
Pan American Games gold medalists for the United States
Pan American Games medalists in athletics (track and field)
Athletes (track and field) at the 1991 Pan American Games
Athletes (track and field) at the 1995 Pan American Games
World Athletics Championships athletes for the United States
Goodwill Games medalists in athletics
World Athletics Indoor Championships winners
Competitors at the 1998 Goodwill Games
Medalists at the 1991 Pan American Games
Medalists at the 1995 Pan American Games
21st-century African-American people
21st-century African-American women
20th-century African-American sportspeople
20th-century African-American women
20th-century African-American people